The 2014–15 season is a season played by Charleroi, a Belgian football club based in Charleroi, Hainaut. The season covers the period from 1 July 2014 to 30 June 2015. Charleroi will be participating in the Belgian Pro League and Belgian Cup.

Review

Background

Pre-season
Charleroi will play eight pre-season fixtures in preparation for the 2014–15 season, matches against Royal Châtelet, Racing Fosses, Differdange 03, Excelsior Virton, F91 Dudelange, White Star Bruxelles, Metz and Lens were scheduled. Charleroi started the run of games with a 3–4 win against Royal Châtelet at Complexe des Sablières, with their goals coming from Sébastien Dewaest, Cédric Fauré, Neeskens Kebano and a hat-trick from Giuseppe Rossini. The club then eased past Racing Fosses 1–5 at the Stade Winson.

The club followed that with two straight wins, firstly a 0–2 win over Differdange 03 followed by a 1–4 win over Excelsior Virton. After that on 8 July Charleroi lost a thrilling match against F91 Dudelange 4–3 at Stade Jos Nosbaum. They followed that with another defeat, this time suffering a 1–0 loss to manager Felice Mazzu's previous club White Star Bruxelles on 12 July. Charleroi won their penultimate pre-season fixture 1–2 against Ligue 1 side Metz, that thanks to a brace from new signing Lynel Kitambala.

On 14 April 2014, Charleroi opened their summer transfer spending with the signing of Mali international Kalifa Coulibaly from Paris Saint-Germain for an undisclosed fee, the striker penned a two-year contract with the option of two further years. Charleroi then signed winger Clinton Mata from Eupen for an undisclosed fee on 28 May, he also signed a two-year contract with the option of two further years. The club completed their first loan signing on 14 June, it was a familiar face who arrived in versatile former Senegal youth international Christophe Diandy who had a loan spell at the club in the 2012–13 season, he joined on a season-long loan deal from Mons.

As Salvatore Crimi left the club following the expiration of his loan deal from Zulte Waregem, Mohamed Mrabet also left the club but only on a season-long loan deal to Virton on 15 May. Charleroi's first transfer activity since the transfer window officially opened on 1 July was the incoming of French winger Lynel Kitambala, he signed for an undisclosed fee from Ligue 1 club Saint-Étienne.

Competitions

Friendlies

Belgian Pro League

Regular season

Championship play-offs

Europa League play-off

Belgian Cup

Appearances and goals

Transfers

Transfers in

Loans in

Total spending:   Undisclosed

Transfers out

Loans out

References

R. Charleroi S.C. seasons
R. Charleroi S.C.